Dinowars: The Jurassic War of the Worlds is a comic book from Antarctic Press. It centers on Earth today beset by dinosaurs that escaped into space to avoid the ice age and have now returned to claim the world as their own, mirroring the original The War of the Worlds. The comic is written and illustrated by Eisner-nominated artist Rod Espinosa.

External links
 Gallery with preview images
 When Dinosaurs Attack!: Interview with Rod Espinosa

Antarctic Press titles
Comics based on The War of the Worlds
Dinosaurs in comic books